Jaden Isaiah Hossler (born February 8, 2001), known professionally as Jxdn (stylized in all lowercase and pronounced "Jaden"), is an American singer, songwriter and TikTok personality from Chattanooga, Tennessee.  Hossler rose to prominence on the video sharing app TikTok in 2019 before beginning a music career in early 2020 with the release of his debut single "Comatose".

Early life
Jaden Isaiah Hossler was born in Texas and lived there until he moved to Tennessee at age 14. He attended Grace Baptist Academy for high school, as well as Aledo High School. Hossler was raised in a Christian household and grew up listening to classic rock and pop music.  While in high school, he had performed in multiple school plays, and during his senior year of high school, Hossler listened to artists such as Juice Wrld and XXXTentacion as he battled depression.  Hossler stated that he attempted suicide twice during the same year.

Career

2019–2020: Career beginnings
In 2019, Hossler joined social media platform TikTok. Over the course of a few months, he gained millions of followers on the app and following his success on the platform, Hossler was invited to join talent agency Talent X and join the Sway House, a Los Angeles-based collective of content creators.  Hossler would later leave the Sway House in May 2020. Despite this, Hossler would continue to see success on the platform, reaching 7.6 million followers in August 2020 and by December 2020, he had accumulated over 9 million followers on the platform.

2020–present: Shift to music, "La Di Die," and Tell Me About Tomorrow 
Hossler began his music career in February 2020, when he self-released his debut single "Comatose".  The single caught the attention of American musician Travis Barker, who signed him to his label DTA Records in a joint deal with Elektra Records.  In May and July 2020, respectively, Hossler released the singles "Angels & Demons" and "So What".  In August 2020, Hossler released the song "Pray" in which he opens up about his depression and suicidal thoughts, using the song to fundraise for suicide prevention.  In October 2020, it was announced that Hossler was signed into a global co-publishing agreement with Warner Chappell Music.  On October 21, 2020, he released a collaboration with Iann Dior, titled "Tonight".  On December 18, 2020, Hossler released the single "Better Off Dead", co-written by Lauv and Blackbear with co-production from Travis Barker. Jxdn also revealed the title of his debut studio album Tell Me About Tomorrow.

In January 2021, Hossler appeared in Machine Gun Kelly's film Downfalls High.  Later in the same month, Hossler released a rock version of Olivia Rodrigo's debut single "Drivers License" with production from Travis Barker.  The following month, Hossler was featured on Nessa Barrett's single "La Di Die".  The two artists, along with Barker, performed the single live for the first time on the April 7, 2021, episode of Jimmy Kimmel Live! and performed the song again on The Ellen DeGeneres Show on April 12, 2021.  During the same month, Hossler was nominated for the Social Star award at the 2021 iHeartRadio Music Awards, but lost to Olivia Rodrigo.

On June 4, 2021, Hossler announced the track listing and release date for Tell Me About Tomorrow and released the fifth single from the album, "Think About Me". The album contains 18 songs and features guest appearances from Machine Gun Kelly and Iann Dior with production from Travis Barker.  The album was released alongside the single "Wanna Be", a collaboration with Machine Gun Kelly.  Hossler made his live concert debut at the Roxy Theatre in West Hollywood later that month.

In August 2021, Hossler performed "Think About Me" as part of MTV's Push series and was nominated for Push Performance of the Year at the 2021 MTV Video Music Awards.  Around the same time, Hossler was an opening act on Machine Gun Kelly's "Tickets to My Downfall" Tour, which started in fall 2021 and also headlined his own "Tell Me About Tomorrow" tour which began at the same time.

On June 28, 2022, Hossler released the singles "Beautiful Boy" and "Even in the Dark" in memory of his friend Cooper Noriega, who died on June 9, 2022.  The songs were released on what would have been Noriega's 20th birthday and were co-written by Barker, Aldae, Nick Long, and Liza Owen.

On November 11, 2022, Hossler released a new single "Sober" which was produced by Barker.

Legal issues
On May 25, 2020, while on a road trip in Lee County, Texas, Hossler and fellow Sway House member Bryce Hall were arrested on drug possession charges.  Hossler was charged with possession of a controlled substance between 4 and 400 grams and was released on bond.

Discography

Studio albums

Extended plays

Singles

As lead artist

As featured artist

Filmography

Tours

Headlining
 Tell Me About Tomorrow Tour (2021-2022)
 I Hope This Never Ends Tour (2023)

Opening act
 Tickets to My Downfall Tour (2021)

Awards and nominations

References

External links
 

2001 births
Pop punk singers
American TikTokers
Living people
Musicians from Dallas